The Assault on Danzig or Battle of Kiezmark was a battle during the Polish–Swedish War of 1626–1629.

On May 25, 1627, the Swedish king Gustavus Adolphus, who in 1626 had taken a fort at Weichsel, near Danzig, attacked from there with 1200 men under the command of the Count of Thurn and Johan Banér. The attack was prematurely discovered by the enemy and the Swedes had to retreat, suffering losses. During the retreat, the Swedish king got hit by a bullet in the abdomen that almost killed him.

In another attack on 4 July the Swedes occupied Danziger Werder.

Sources
 Danziger haupt, "Nordisk familjebok" (2nd edition, 1906)

Conflicts in 1627
1627 in Europe
Danzig
Danzig
History of Gdańsk
Events in Gdańsk